The canton of Villegusien-le-Lac is an administrative division of the Haute-Marne department, northeastern France. It was created at the French canton reorganisation which came into effect in March 2015. Its seat is in Villegusien-le-Lac.

It consists of the following communes:
 
Aprey
Arbot
Auberive
Aujeurres
Aulnoy-sur-Aube
Baissey
Bay-sur-Aube
Bourg
Brennes
Chalancey
Chassigny
Choilley-Dardenay
Cohons
Colmier-le-Bas
Colmier-le-Haut
Coublanc
Courcelles-en-Montagne
Cusey
Dommarien
Flagey
Germaines
Isômes
Leuchey
Longeau-Percey
Maâtz
Le Montsaugeonnais
Mouilleron
Noidant-le-Rocheux
Occey
Orcevaux
Perrogney-les-Fontaines
Poinsenot
Poinson-lès-Grancey
Praslay
Rivière-les-Fosses
Rochetaillée
Rouelles
Rouvres-sur-Aube
Saint-Broingt-les-Fosses
Saint-Loup-sur-Aujon
Ternat
Vaillant
Le Val-d'Esnoms
Vals-des-Tilles
Vauxbons
Verseilles-le-Bas
Verseilles-le-Haut
Vesvres-sous-Chalancey
Villars-Santenoge
Villegusien-le-Lac
Villiers-lès-Aprey
Vitry-en-Montagne
Vivey
Voisines

References

Cantons of Haute-Marne